Carlos Eduardo de Fiori Mendes (born 31 August 1986), commonly known as Cadú, is a Brazilian former footballer who played as an attacking midfielder.

Club career

Early career
Born in Andradina, Brazil, Cadú started his senior career in his homeland by playing with Campinas Futebol Clube and Porto Alegre. He left Brazil and moved to Montenegro in summer 2007 by joining Montenegrin First League side FK Zeta where he played the following two seasons.

Red Star Belgrade
Cadú and Sávio had been teammates since 2007, first in Porto Alegre then in Zeta, when both were signed by Serbian side Red Star Belgrade in June 2009. Cadú signed a four-year contract with Red Star, earning €200,000 per season. Cadú played an important role in Red Star's matches during the qualification for the UEFA Europa League since he joined the team in 2009. His first goal for Red Star Belgrade in any UEFA league was scored against Dinamo Tbilisi in the second qualifying round of the Europa League. In the third qualifying round of the 2010–11 UEFA Europa League qualifying phase and play-off round, he scored a goal against Slovan Bratislava. In a Belgrade Derby match on 5 May 2012, Red Star won against its eternal rival Partizan by 1–0, with Cadú scoring the decisive 90th-minute goal from over 20 meters out. By the end of his career at Red Star he was the most scoring foreign player, and also a foreign player with most appearances in Red Star Belgrade's history.

Sheriff Tiraspol
Cadú joined Sheriff Tiraspol on 17 June 2013, through a bosman move after his contract at Red Star wasn't renewed. In the 2013-14 UEFA Champions League second qualifying round, Cadú scored his first goal for Sheriff in a 5–0 win against FK Sutjeska Nikšić. He played as a starting player throughout Sheriff's 2013-14 Europa League group stage campaign, and scored a goal against Tromsø in Tiraspol. On 21 March 2016, Cadú left Sheriff abruptly due to a family circumstance.

Career statistics

Honours
Sheriff Tiraspol
 Moldovan National Division: 2013–14
 Moldovan Super Cup: 2014

Red Star
 Serbian Cup: 2009–10, 2011–12

References

External links
 Profile 
  
 

1986 births
Living people
Footballers from São Paulo (state)
Brazilian footballers
Association football forwards
Porto Alegre Futebol Clube players
FK Zeta players
Red Star Belgrade footballers
FC Sheriff Tiraspol players
Akhaa Ahli Aley FC players
Balzan F.C. players
Montenegrin First League players
Serbian SuperLiga players
Moldovan Super Liga players
Lebanese Premier League players
Maltese Premier League players
Brazilian expatriate footballers
Expatriate footballers in Montenegro
Expatriate footballers in Serbia
Expatriate footballers in Moldova
Expatriate footballers in Lebanon
Expatriate footballers in Malta
Brazilian expatriate sportspeople in Montenegro
Brazilian expatriate sportspeople in Serbia
Brazilian expatriate sportspeople in Moldova
Brazilian expatriate sportspeople in Lebanon
Brazilian expatriate sportspeople in Malta
People from Andradina